Port Washington Water Aerodrome, formerly , is located adjacent to Port Washington, British Columbia, Canada. Port Washington lies at the north end of North Pender Island in the Gulf Islands of the Gulf of Georgia.

Airlines and destinations

Former airlines include Saltspring Air and Seair Seaplanes with both having service to Vancouver International Water Airport.

See also
 List of airports in the Gulf Islands

References

Defunct seaplane bases in British Columbia
Transport in the Capital Regional District
Airports in the Gulf Islands